Angie Paola Palacios Dájomes (born September 12, 2000) is an Ecuadorian weightlifter and two time Youth World Champion competing in the 69 kg category until 2018 and 64 kg starting in 2018 after the International Weightlifting Federation reorganized the categories. She is the younger sister of three time Junior World Champion Neisi Dajomes.

Career
She competed in the 64 kg division at the 2019 Junior World Weightlifting Championships in Fiji winning silver medals in the snatch, clean & jerk, and total. Later she competed at the 2019 Pan American Games in the 64 kg division winning a bronze medal.

She represented Ecuador at the 2020 Summer Olympics.

She won the gold medal in the women's 71kg event at the 2022 Pan American Weightlifting Championships held in Bogotá, Colombia. She also won medals in the Snatch and Clean & Jerk events in this competition.

She won the gold medal in the women's 76kg event at the 2022 South American Games held in Asunción, Paraguay.

Achievements

References

External links
 

2000 births
Living people
Ecuadorian female weightlifters
Pan American Games medalists in weightlifting
Pan American Games bronze medalists for Ecuador
Weightlifters at the 2019 Pan American Games
Medalists at the 2019 Pan American Games
Pan American Weightlifting Championships medalists
Weightlifters at the 2020 Summer Olympics
Olympic weightlifters of Ecuador
South American Games gold medalists for Ecuador
South American Games medalists in weightlifting
Competitors at the 2022 South American Games
World Weightlifting Championships medalists
21st-century Ecuadorian women